Mikhail Khryukin (born 1955) is a Russian swimmer who won a silver medal in the 100 m breaststroke at the 1973 World Aquatics Championships. In 1973, he also set two European records in the same event. Between 1973 and 1975 he won four national titles in breaststroke and medley relay disciplines. He later competed in the masters category, winning three national titles in 2009 and setting three national records in 2006.

References

1955 births
Living people
Russian male swimmers
Male breaststroke swimmers
Soviet male swimmers
World Aquatics Championships medalists in swimming
Sportspeople from Voronezh